The Arizona Whirlwind is a 1927 American silent Western film directed by William James Craft and starring Bill Cody, Margaret Hampton and David Dunbar.

Cast
 Bill Cody as Bill Farley 
 Margaret Hampton as Helen Dykeman 
 David Dunbar as Bert Hawley 
 Hughie Mack as Gonzales 
 Clark Comstock

References

External links
 

1927 films
1927 Western (genre) films
Films directed by William James Craft
1920s English-language films
Pathé Exchange films
American black-and-white films
Silent American Western (genre) films
1920s American films